TV3 Winchester was a subchannel service of Harrisonburg, Virginia-based television station WHSV-TV, programmed as a standalone, primarily-cable station serving as the ABC and secondary This TV affiliate for nearby Winchester, Virginia from 2007 to 2013. Owned by Gray Television, it maintained studios on Millwood Avenue and US 50 in Winchester, separate from its parent's studios in Harrisonburg.

The channel was available on Comcast Xfinity channel 3 in Frederick, Clarke and Warren counties and ShenTel Cable channel 101 in Shenandoah County, and on UHF channels 49.3 (PSIP 3.3) in the Harrisonburg area via the main WHSV transmitter.  From 2010 until its 2013 shutdown, it was also available in the northern Shenandoah Valley on UHF channel 42.3 via a translator station on Signal Knob near Strasburg.  It was never available on cable in the immediate Harrisonburg market.

History and personnel
TV-3 Winchester was first announced at a press conference at Shenandoah University in 2005. Ground was broken for the new studios, which is located along Millwood Pike in Winchester, on March 1, 2006. The studios were shared with Shenandoah University's Public-access television cable TV-only station, "Winchester Community Television". Construction was completed in November 2006 and the station launched on March 5, 2007.

Brad Ramsey, formerly the sports director/anchor and more recently a sales account executive at WHSV, handled general manager duties. Brad brought Tony Versley, an Emmy Award-winning broadcast engineer on board as Director of Operations and Doug Stanford, formerly of WHSV, as Director of Creative Services and Promotions.  Bill DuVall was hired in September 2006 as TV-3's News Director. DuVall previously worked at WVIR in Charlottesville, Virginia as a co-anchor of NBC29 News at Sunrise, and before that at WYVN (now WWPX) in Martinsburg, West Virginia from 1991 to 1994.  DuVall turned the reins of TV-3 Winchester over to Denise Chandler in 2008.

Gray Television shut down TV3 Winchester on December 5, 2013, citing inability to make the station a viable long-term operation.  Gray kept the UHF 42 WHSV-TV translator in Strasburg on the air providing the same programming as the main Harrisonburg service, but area cable systems returned to uniformly providing Washington's WJLA-TV as ABC affiliate, as they had before the launch of TV3 Winchester. WHSV-DT3 remained vacant until October 2018 when a 16:9 standard definition feed of Ion Television was eventually added to that subchannel.

References

Gray Television
Television channels and stations established in 2007
Television channels and stations disestablished in 2013
Defunct television stations in the United States
2007 establishments in Virginia
2013 disestablishments in Virginia
Television stations in Virginia
Winchester, Virginia
Defunct mass media in Virginia